Nelson Emery Margetts (May 27, 1879 – April 17, 1932) was an American polo player. He competed in the polo tournament at the 1920 Summer Olympics winning a bronze medal.

Born and raised in Utah, Margetts enlisted in the United States Army on May 9, 1898 and served with the Utah Light Artillery in the Philippines during the Spanish–American War. He was offered a commission in the Artillery Corps on September 23, 1901 which he accepted on June 14, 1902. During World War I, he served on General John J. Pershing's staff in France and received a temporary promotion to colonel on June 25, 1918. After the war, Margetts reverted to his permanent rank of major on June 30, 1920. After participation in the 1920 Olympics, he was given command of the 79th Field Artillery Regiment at Camp Meade. Margetts graduated from the School of the Line in 1922, the General Staff School in 1923 and the Army War College in 1924. He was promoted to lieutenant colonel on March 26, 1924.

In December 1929, Margetts was assigned as a military attaché in China. He died at the Letterman General Hospital at the Presidio of San Francisco and was buried at the San Francisco National Cemetery.

References

External links
 

1879 births
1932 deaths
United States Army soldiers
Military personnel from Utah
American military personnel of the Spanish–American War
United States Army officers
United States Army personnel of World War I
American polo players
Sportspeople from Salt Lake City
Polo players at the 1920 Summer Olympics
Olympic medalists in polo
Olympic polo players of the United States
Olympic bronze medalists for the United States
Medalists at the 1920 Summer Olympics
United States Army Command and General Staff College alumni
United States Army War College alumni
United States military attachés
Burials at San Francisco National Cemetery